Laurent Morali (born January 1975) is a French-born, US-based real estate developer, president of the privately held and family-owned Kushner Companies since June 2016, having been head of acquisitions and capital markets.

Early life
Morali was born in Metz, France in January 1975, and educated at Toulouse Business School (École Supérieure de Commerce de Toulouse), in France, from 1995 to 1998.

Career
Morali joined Kushner Companies in 2008, having previously worked for Calyon Securities, a French financial firm.

Personal life
He is married to Liat, and they have three sons. He is the co-founder and lead guitar for the band Local Law.

References

Living people
Toulouse Business School alumni
Businesspeople from New York City
French expatriates in the United States
1975 births
People from Metz